Sagamia geneionema is a species of fish in the subfamily, Gobionellinae, and the only species in the monotypic genus Sagamia. It is native to the coastal waters of Japan and Korea, where it lives near shore in areas with sandy substrates. This species grows to a length of  SL.

This is an annual species; the adults spawn in January through March, and then nearly all of them die and are replaced by the larvae of the next generation by the following June. The diet of juveniles and adults is largely made up of amphipods. The larvae are prey for other fish such as the sunrise (Pseudoblennius percoides), a species of sculpin.

References

Gobionellinae
Monotypic fish genera
Taxa named by Franz Martin Hilgendorf
Fish described in 1879